

National Garifuna Council NGC (Belize) 

The National Garifuna Council  NGC (Belize) is a non-governmental organization that represents the Indigenous Garifuna people of Belize. Their mission is to preserve, strengthen and develop the Garifuna culture, as well as to promote economic development, interracial harmony of the Garifuna people, and maintain traditional respect for preserving the environment . These countries all share the unique Garifuna culture, as the all served as refuge to the Garifuna people when they were exiled from their homeland St. Vincent.

History 
The Garinagu arrived in Belize in  1802 in  small amount and in 1832 in larger amount. As a result of the free status of the Garinagu in a settlement whose black population was still enslaved, conflict  arose between them and the white land owners. They disallowed contact between the slaves and the Garinagu, and tried tirelessly to keep the Garinagu from advancing within the community. Despite such efforts of the colonial masters, in 1922, the Carib Development Society was formed through the efforts of Thomas Vincent Ramos in Dangriga Town. Its purpose was to help the sick and offer financial support to those in need of it. After his death, the work was taken up by a group of people known as the National Garifuna Council (NGC) along with the Cairb Development Society (CDS). However, it was until 1981, that NGC outlined its objectives in a Memorandum.

Objectives and Activities 
Some objective of the National Garifuna Council includes; fostering economic development in Garifuna communities, by facilitating business growth, ensuring that the Garifuna cultural heritage is nurtured and promoted, to advocate for education and community outreach programs that seeks to address the issues that affect the people and to empower youth participation in the development of the culture, among others.

Structure 
Any individual who reaches the age of 15 can become a member after subscribing and paying an entrance fee. NGC is managed by a board of directors consisting of 15 and not more than 30 members, who are responsible to register and keep records of such members. The headquarters NGC is situated in Dangriga Town, in the Stann Creek District, in the country of Belize. Memorandum of Association (Constitution) of National Garifuna Council. An annual convention is held once every year at a place prescribed at the convention or by the directors.  Twenty five members make up quorum for a convention, but half of the existing branches must be represented, if not it must be dissolved. The president of the board of directors and in his absence the Vice President chairs all convention. In the absence of both the President and the Vice President, a member selected by the convention shall be the chairman of the convention. Business at the convention includes; receiving and adopting the report of the Directors, the financial reports, amendments to the constitution of the council.

Major Accomplishments 
On April 12, 1997, the anniversary of the arrival of the Garifuna people in Central America was celebrated. This event brought about awareness to the circumstances surrounding their exile from their homeland St. Vincent such as; the real reason for the attempted genocide and their appreciation for survival.  The mere fact that they survived such inhumane treatment and managed to exist today brought them to the realization that their culture is threatened.

The National Garifuna Council prepared a draft Language Policy Statement of the Garifuna Nation for the Central American Black Organization (CABO) meeting that was to be held in December 1997. The draft outlined the reason for and the request for a language policy and development initiatives, as well as for the rights of the indigenous people to be guaranteed by the local governments of Belize, Guatemala, Honduras and Nicaragua, and declared by the United Nations. Another accomplishment was the building of the Pablo Lambey  Garifuna Cultural Center in Dangriga. In the year 1999, NGC signed a memorandum of understanding between themselves and the Government of Belize.

The United Nations Educational, Scientific and Cultural Organization (UNESCO) developed an action plan that seeks to secure recognition of the Garifuna language and culture by the government of Belize, Guatemala, Honduras, and Nicaragua. It seeks to address the concerns of the culture a series of activities relating to land, education, language, culture, other social issues and community and economic development. UNESCO acknowledged that during this era of globalization, many areas of the Garifuna culture were disappearing, threatened by cultural standardization, conflict, armed conflict, industrialization, migration, and environmental deterioration. Thus, in 2001, UNESCO declared the Garifuna Language, Dance and Music of Belize, “Masterpiece of the Oral and Intangible Heritage of Humanity.” This initiative helps The Garifuna to gain international recognition in cultural identity and promote harmonious interaction between cultures.

NGC has completed a 2-year institutional strengthening project, which focused on providing technical support to build the capacity of the organization in order to fulfill its mandate. The objective was to develop the income generating potential of Garifuna communities and NGc while considering the culture for business opportunities, and to improve the socio-economic situation of most Garifuna communities. NGC also developed the Hamali Garinagu NGC Radio Station in Dangriga Town in the year 2002. In 2004, they opened the First Garifuna Museum in Belize located at the Monument Land. This museum was mainly finance by a grant from the Taiwan Government, assisted by the Government of Belize as well as private donors.

On September 11, 2007, the National Garifuna Council with the support of the Ministry of Education opened a new pre and primary school, named Gulisi Primary School. This school was named in honor of Gulisi, the daughter of the legendary Chief Joseph Chatoyer. At the school the students are taught equally in the native Garifuna language and English while carrying out the standard primary school curriculum of Belize.

References

References

Organisations based in Belize